is a passenger railway station located in the village of Geisei, Aki District, Kōchi Prefecture, Japan. It is operated by the third-sector Tosa Kuroshio Railway with the station number "GN31".

Lines
All Asa Line trains, both rapid and local, stop at the station.

Layout
The station consists of an island platform serving two tracks on an embankment. There is no station building and the station is unstaffed but a waiting room has been set up at the base of the embankment together with parking lots and a bike shed. Access to the platforms is by two separate flights of steps.

Adjacent stations

Station mascot
Each station on the Asa Line features a cartoon mascot character designed by Takashi Yanase, a local cartoonist from Kōchi Prefecture. The mascot for Wajiki Station is a kappa named . The design is chosen because local folklore refers to kappa, a river Yōkai (imp or demon), inhabits the nearby Wajiki river.

History

Passenger statistics
In fiscal 2011, the station was used by an average of 223 passengers daily.

Surrounding area
Japan National Route 55

See also 
List of railway stations in Japan

References

External links

Railway stations in Kōchi Prefecture
Railway stations in Japan opened in 2002